The Tuaran District is an administrative district in the Malaysian state of Sabah, part of the West Coast Division which includes the districts of Kota Belud, Kota Kinabalu, Papar, Penampang, Putatan, Ranau and Tuaran. The capital of the district is in Tuaran Town.

Etymology 
The origin of the name of "Tuaran" is somewhat uncertain as a settlement had existed since before the arrival of the British. One of the earliest recorded evidence of the use of Tuaran is through the letter of Stamford Raffles. After he became the governor of Java in 1813, he requested the British secretary in India to give him permission to enter the northern Borneo area after being invited by the Sultanate of Brunei. The Sultan of Brunei request help from Raffles as the waters around Jawaran (Tuaran) and Jampasoo (Tempasuk) have been infected with piracy. The letter stated:

Administrative division 

Tuaran District includes:

Demographics 

According to the last census in 2010, the population of the district is estimated to be around 102,411, mainly Dusun and Bajau people as well a significant number of Chinese and Malay. As in other districts of Sabah, there are a significant number of illegal immigrants from the nearby southern Philippines, mainly from the Sulu Archipelago and Mindanao, many of whom are not included in the population statistics.

Tourism 
Tourist attractions in Tuaran include the Mengkabong and Penimbawan water villages, which are villages of stilt houses built over the seashore by the Bajau people, and the Ling San Pagoda (Traditional Chinese: 龍山塔), a nine-storey Buddhist pagoda situated just outside the town centre. The main tourist resorts in Tuaran are the Mimpian Jadi Resort and Shangri-La's Rasa Ria Resort. In addition to food and lodging, these resorts offer various other activities such as golfing and water sports.

Gallery

See also 
 Districts of Malaysia

References

Further reading

External links 

  Tuaran District Council
  Tuaran District Office